Joseph Kraus may refer to:

 Joseph Anton Kraus (died 1721), German sculptor
 Joseph Martin Kraus (1756–1792), composer